Khaledabad (also Romanized as Khāledābād; also known as Khālidābād and Khālīābād) is a city in Emamzadeh District, in Natanz County, Isfahan Province, Iran.  At the 2006 census, its population was 3,308, in 859 families.

References

Populated places in Natanz County
Cities in Isfahan Province